Tryphena is a beach settlement on the southern coast of Great Barrier Island in the Hauraki Gulf of New Zealand's Auckland Region.

The township has a walkway, shops and public facilities. It was one of the only areas in Great Barrier Island with good mobile and internet connectivity.

SeaLink New Zealand operates a 4.5 hour car ferry between Tryphena and Wynyard Quarter. The Tryphena wharf has a shelter, wheelchair toilet and limited short-term parking. There is no terminal, ticket office, long-term parking or public transport.

The area is a habitat for New Zealand kaka, kererū, rails, pateke, blue penguins, dolphins and orcas.

The area is used for kayaking, paddleboarding, fishing, boating and swimming.

History

The bay was traditionally the site of a pā (fortified settlement) of Ngāti Rehua Ngati Wai ki Aotea.

During the 19th century, early European settlers arrived in the bay, calling it Port Tofino.

The settlement was renamed Tryphena, after a brig of the same name made several visits to Great Barrier Island between 1841 and 1845.

Tryphena House was built in front of the original Tryphena wharf in 1923, using the remnants of a shipwreck in the bay. The building is now used for accommodation.

In May 2020, members of Ngāti Rehua Ngati Wai ki Aotea attempted to establish a checkpoint at the Tryphena Wharf, to prevent people from visiting the island during the COVID-19 pandemic in New Zealand.

Demographics
Tryphena is part of the larger Barrier Islands statistical area.

Tryphena had a population of 201 at the 2018 New Zealand census, an increase of 24 people (13.6%) since the 2013 census, and an increase of 57 people (39.6%) since the 2006 census. There were 81 households, comprising 102 males and 102 females, giving a sex ratio of 1.0 males per female. The median age was 51.6 years (compared with 37.4 years nationally), with 27 people (13.4%) aged under 15 years, 24 (11.9%) aged 15 to 29, 105 (52.2%) aged 30 to 64, and 45 (22.4%) aged 65 or older.

Ethnicities were 91.0% European/Pākehā, 26.9% Māori, 1.5% Pacific peoples, 1.5% Asian, and 3.0% other ethnicities. People may identify with more than one ethnicity.

Although some people chose not to answer the census's question about religious affiliation, 71.6% had no religion, 22.4% were Christian and 1.5% had other religions.

Of those at least 15 years old, 21 (12.1%) people had a bachelor's or higher degree, and 30 (17.2%) people had no formal qualifications. The median income was $21,200, compared with $31,800 nationally. 12 people (6.9%) earned over $70,000 compared to 17.2% nationally. The employment status of those at least 15 was that 57 (32.8%) people were employed full-time, 42 (24.1%) were part-time, and 12 (6.9%) were unemployed.

Education
Mulberry Grove School is a coeducational full primary (years 1-8) school with a roll of  students as of  The school was established in 1962. Tryphena School operated from 1884 to 1939, when it closed because the roll was very low.

References

Great Barrier Island
Beaches of the Auckland Region
Populated places in the Auckland Region
Populated places around the Hauraki Gulf / Tīkapa Moana